The 2001–02 season was Sheffield Wednesday F.C.'s 135th season. They competed in the twenty-four team First Division, the second tier of English football, finishing twentieth.

Season summary
After another bad start in the 2001–02 season, Shreeves handed the reins over to assistant Terry Yorath. Wednesday finished just two places above the Division One relegation zone and the only bright spot of the season was a run to the semi finals of the League Cup.

Final league table

Results
Sheffield Wednesday's score comes first

Legend

Football League First Division

FA Cup

League Cup

Squad

Left club during season

Reserve squad

References

 
 
 
 

2001-02
Sheffield Wednesday